Platylobium is a genus of shrubs in the family Fabaceae. Native to south eastern  Australia, they occur in a range of habitats of the coastal regions. The genus was first described by James Edward Smith, and is closely allied to Bossiaea, another genus within the Mirbelioids.

The plants within this and other genera of the Mirbelioids are well known. They often have a common name that alludes to the oblongate pod described in the binary name—such as 'flat pea'—or by its exhibition of a yellow, orange, and pinky-red fluorescence—'eggs and bacon' peas. Papery dark brown scales support the banner of the pea's flower, this completes the semblance to a cooked breakfast. These flowers are displayed on rambling branches, sometimes as a short shrub, often extending prostrate. They range inland in coastal regions Southern and Eastern Australia, including Tasmania.

Platylobium is found to have a distinct wing on the pod, this distinguishes the genus from that of Bossiaea. Examination of the ovate leaves, distinction in the brown papery parts near the bract and diversion in the form of various parts will allow identification of the two species described below.

Species
Platylobium comprises the following species:
 Platylobium alternifolium F.Muell.—Victorian flat-pea
 Platylobium formosum  Sm.—Handsome flat-pea
 Platylobium obtusangulum Hook.—Common flat-pea
 Platylobium triangulare R.Br.—Ivy flat-pea

Species names with uncertain taxonomic status
The status of the following species is unresolved:
 Platylobium aphyllum Steud.
 Platylobium gracile Steud.
 Platylobium infecundum I.Thomps.
 Platylobium linifolium Czerw. & Warsc.
 Platylobium macrocalyx Meisn.
 Platylobium montanum I.Thomps.
 Platylobium murrayanum Hook.
 Platylobium obcordatum Vent.
 Platylobium parviflorum Sm.
 Platylobium reflexum I.Thomps.
 Platylobium reticulatum Sieber ex Spreng.
 Platylobium rotundifolium Colla
 Platylobium rotundum I.Thomps.
 Platylobium scolopendrium Andrews

References

Further reading

External links 

 
Mirbelioids
Fabales of Australia
Fabaceae genera